Atqasuk  is a city in North Slope Borough, Alaska, United States. The population was 228 at the 2000 census and 233 as of the 2010 census.

Geography
Atqasuk is located at  (70.477663, -157.418056), on the Meade River.

Demographics

Atqasuk first appeared on the 1940 U.S. Census as the unincorporated village of "Meade River." It reported on the 1950 census as "Tikikluk." In 1960, it returned again as Meade River. It did not appear on the 1970 census. It next reported on the 1980 U.S. Census as "Atkasook", and was made a census designated place (CDP). It formally incorporated in 1982 as Atqasuk.

As of the 2010 United States Census, there were 233 people living in the city. The racial makeup of the city was 92.3% Native American, 6.9% White and 0.9% from two or more races.

As of the census of 2000, there were 228 people, 55 households, and 44 families living in the city.  The population density was 5.9 people per square mile (2.3/km).  There were 60 housing units at an average density of 1.5 per square mile (0.6/km).  The racial makeup of the city was 94.30% Native Alaskan, 4.82% White, 0.44% Asian, and 0.44% from two or more races.

There were 55 households, out of which 50.9% had children under the age of 18 living with them, 47.3% were married couples living together, 21.8% had a female householder with no husband present, and 18.2% were non-families. 16.4% of all households were made up of individuals, and none had someone living alone who was 65 years of age or older.  The average household size was 4.15 and the average family size was 4.49.

In the city, the age distribution of the population shows 40.4% under the age of 18, 8.8% from 18 to 24, 29.8% from 25 to 44, 15.4% from 45 to 64, and 5.7% who were 65 years of age or older.  The median age was 26 years. For every 100 females, there were 113.1 males.  For every 100 females age 18 and over, there were 123.0 males.

The median income for a household in the city was $66,607, and the median income for a family was $53,750. Males had a median income of $41,875 versus $27,500 for females. The per capita income for the city was $14,732.  About 25.0% of families and 15.6% of the population were below the poverty line, including 4.9% of those under the age of eighteen and 57.1% of those 65 or over.

Education
The North Slope Borough School District operates the Meade River School in Atqasuk.

References

External links

 Atqasuk  at the Community Database Online from the Alaska Division of Community and Regional Affairs
 Maps from the Alaska Department of Labor and Workforce Development: 2000, 2010
 North Slope Borough: Atqasuk
 Arctic Slope Regional Corporation: Atqasuk
 Atqasuk images

Cities in Alaska
Cities in North Slope Borough, Alaska
Populated places of the Arctic United States
Road-inaccessible communities of Alaska